Leonid Gofshtein (also known by his Hebrew name Zvulon Gofshtein  ; 21 April 1953 – 25 December 2015) was an Israeli chess grandmaster. He emigrated from the Ukrainian SSR to Israel in 1990.

In 1999 he tied for 1st–5th with Mikhail Gurevich, Aleksandar Berelovich, Sergei Tiviakov and Rustam Kasimdzhanov in the open section of the Hoogeveen International tournament. In 2000 he came second in the Tel Aviv International tournament and tied for 2nd–6th with Roman Slobodjan, Ventzislav Inkiov, Giorgi Bagaturov and Stefan Đurić in the Arco Chess Festival. In 2004 he tied for 1st–3rd with Michael Roiz and Evgeniy Najer in the Ashdod Chess Festival. In 2006, tied for 2nd–5th with Slavko Cicak, José González García and Josep Manuel Lopez Martinez in the VIII Sants Open.

He played for Israel in the 30th Chess Olympiad in Manila 1992. On the May 2010 FIDE list his Elo rating was 2537.

Gofshtein's handle on the Internet Chess Club was "Orange". He died on 25 December 2015 after a long illness.

References

External links

1953 births
2015 deaths
Chess grandmasters
Chess Olympiad competitors
Israeli chess players
Israeli people of Ukrainian-Jewish descent
Jewish chess players
Jewish Israeli sportspeople
Ukrainian chess players
Ukrainian emigrants to Israel
Ukrainian Jews
Soviet chess players
Soviet emigrants to Israel
Soviet Jews